Babe and Friends is a 1999 Game Boy Color game developed by Aqua Pacific Ltd, based upon the 1995 film Babe. 

Gameplay

 Babe and Friends is a puzzle game played in top-down perspective. The player guides Babe through 40 stages across five levels to lead for a herd of sheep through various obstacles, which the player is required to position or manipulate in order to create a clear path. The game begins on a farm, but levels change the environment, each with their own distinctive obstacles, such as airports featuring carts and escalators. The game is also backwards compatible with previous Game Boy units, including the Pocket Game Boy and Super Game Boy.

Reception

Reviews for Babe and Friends were lukewarm. Critics praised the difficulty and learning curve of the puzzles of the game. Kyle Knight of Allgame praised the "well-designed puzzles" and "graduated difficulty curve" of Babe and Friends as "amongst the best in the business", with "each puzzle...more challenging and more intriguing than the last". Critics noted the limited playtime and variety featured in the game. Hyper noted "the keen puzzle fan will finish this one off in a flash. Craig Harris of IGN'' praised the "complex patterns" of the puzzles, but noted "it's obvious this game is aimed at the younger crowd...it really only took me an hour to get halfway through the game".

References

External links

1999 video games
Crave Entertainment games
Game Boy Color games
Game Boy Color-only games
Puzzle video games
Single-player video games
Video games about pigs
Video games based on films
Aqua Pacific games